Burunköy can refer to:

 Burunköy, Çorum
 Burunköy, Mut